Andrew J. Finch is a game designer who has worked primarily on role-playing games.

Career
Andrew Finch began working at Wizards of the Coast in 1996, and held a number of different positions. Finch was ultimately working as the Director of Digital Game Design when he was laid off in 2008.

His D&D design work includes Monster Manual III (2004).

Finch was one of the designers on the "Lorwyn" set (2007) for Magic: The Gathering.

References

External links
 

American game designers
Dungeons & Dragons game designers
Living people
Place of birth missing (living people)
Year of birth missing (living people)